Merrilliopanax alpinus is a species of plant in the family Araliaceae. It is found in Tibet (China), Bhutan, northeast India, and Nepal.

References

Araliaceae
Flora of Assam (region)
Flora of Tibet
Vulnerable plants
Trees of Nepal
Taxonomy articles created by Polbot
Taxobox binomials not recognized by IUCN